Pennsylvania ratified the United States Constitution on December 12, 1787, and elects its U.S. senators to Class 1 and Class 3. Officeholders are popularly elected, for a six-year term, beginning January 3. Elections are held the first Tuesday after November 1. Before 1914, they were chosen by the Pennsylvania General Assembly; before 1935, their terms began March 4. The state's current U.S. senators are Democrats Bob Casey Jr. (since 2007) and John Fetterman (since 2023). Arlen Specter was Pennsylvania's longest-serving senator (1981–2011).

List of senators

|- style="height:2em"
! 1
| align=left | William Maclay
|  | Anti-Admin.
| nowrap | Mar 4, 1789 –Mar 3, 1791
| Elected in 1788.Lost re-election.
| 1
| 
| rowspan=6 | 1
| rowspan=6 | Elected in 1788.Retired.
| rowspan=6 nowrap | Mar 4, 1789 –Mar 3, 1795
| rowspan=6  | Pro-Admin.
| rowspan=6 align=right | Robert Morris
! rowspan=6 | 1

|- style="height:2em"
| colspan=3 | Vacant
| nowrap | Mar 4, 1791 –Dec 1, 1793
| Legislature failed to elect.
| rowspan=6 | 2
| rowspan=2 

|- style="height:2em"
! rowspan=2 | 2
| rowspan=2 align=left | Albert Gallatin
| rowspan=2  | Anti-Admin.
| rowspan=2 nowrap | Dec 2, 1793 –Feb 28, 1794
| rowspan=2 | Elected to finish the vacant term.Election voided.

|- style="height:2em"
| rowspan=3 

|- style="height:2em"
| colspan=3 | Vacant
| nowrap | Mar 1, 1794 –Apr 23, 1794
|  

|- style="height:2em"
! rowspan=7 | 3
| rowspan=7 align=left | James Ross
|  | Pro-Admin.
| rowspan=7 nowrap | Apr 24, 1794 –Mar 3, 1803
| rowspan=2 | Elected to finish Gallatin's term.

|- style="height:2em"
| rowspan=6  | Federalist
| 
| rowspan=3 | 2
| rowspan=3 | Elected in 1795.Retired.
| rowspan=3 nowrap | Mar 4, 1795 –Mar 3, 1801
| rowspan=3  | Federalist
| rowspan=3 align=right | William Bingham
! rowspan=3 | 2

|- style="height:2em"
| rowspan=5 | Re-elected in 1797.Retired.
| rowspan=5 | 3
| 

|- style="height:2em"
| 

|- style="height:2em"
| rowspan=3 
| rowspan=5 | 3
| Elected in 1801.Resigned to become Supervisor of Revenue of Pennsylvania.
| nowrap | Mar 4, 1801 –Jun 30, 1801
|  | Democratic-Republican
| align=right | Peter Muhlenberg
! 3

|- style="height:2em"
|  
| nowrap | Jun 30, 1801 –Dec 17, 1801
| colspan=3 | Vacant

|- style="height:2em"
| rowspan=3 | Elected to finish Muhlenberg's term.Retired.
| rowspan=3 nowrap | Dec 17, 1801 –Mar 3, 1807
| rowspan=3  | Democratic-Republican
| rowspan=3 align=right | George Logan
! rowspan=3 | 4

|- style="height:2em"
! rowspan=3 | 4
| rowspan=3 align=left | Samuel Maclay
| rowspan=3  | Democratic-Republican
| rowspan=3 nowrap | Mar 4, 1803 –Jan 4, 1809
| rowspan=3 | Elected in 1802.Resigned.
| rowspan=5 | 4
| 

|- style="height:2em"
| 

|- style="height:2em"
| rowspan=3 
| rowspan=5 | 4
| rowspan=5 | Elected in 1806.Retired.
| rowspan=5 nowrap | Mar 4, 1807 –Mar 3, 1813
| rowspan=5  | Democratic-Republican
| rowspan=5 align=right | Andrew Gregg
! rowspan=5 | 5

|- style="height:2em"
| colspan=3 | Vacant
| nowrap | Jan 4, 1809 –Jan 9, 1809
| Vacant

|- style="height:2em"
! rowspan=4 | 5
| rowspan=4 align=left | Michael Leib
| rowspan=4  | Democratic-Republican
| rowspan=4 nowrap | Jan 9, 1809 –Feb 14, 1814
| Elected in 1809 to finish Maclay's term, having already been elected to the next term.

|- style="height:2em"
| rowspan=3 | Elected in 1808.Resigned to become Postmaster of Philadelphia.
| rowspan=5 | 5
| 

|- style="height:2em"
| 

|- style="height:2em"
| rowspan=3 
| rowspan=5 | 5
| rowspan=5 | Elected in 1812.Retired.
| rowspan=5 nowrap | Mar 4, 1813 –Mar 3, 1819
| rowspan=5  | Democratic-Republican
| rowspan=5 align=right | Abner Lacock
! rowspan=5 | 6

|- style="height:2em"
| colspan=3 | Vacant
| nowrap | Feb 14, 1814 –Feb 24, 1814
|
|- style="height:2em"
! rowspan=4 | 6
| rowspan=4 align=left | Jonathan Roberts
| rowspan=4  | Democratic-Republican
| rowspan=4 nowrap | Feb 24, 1814 –Mar 3, 1821
| Elected to finish Leib's term.

|- style="height:2em"
| rowspan=3 | Re-elected in late 1814.
| rowspan=3 | 6
| 

|- style="height:2em"
| 

|- style="height:2em"
| 
| rowspan=4 | 6
| rowspan=4 | Elected in 1818.Retired.
| rowspan=4 nowrap | Mar 4, 1819 –Mar 3, 1825
| rowspan=4  | Democratic-Republican
| rowspan=4 align=right | Walter Lowrie
! rowspan=4 | 7

|- style="height:2em"
| colspan=3 | Vacant
| nowrap | Mar 4, 1821 –Dec 10, 1821
| Legislature failed to elect.
| rowspan=4 | 7
| rowspan=2 

|- style="height:2em"
! rowspan=3 | 7
| rowspan=3 align=left | William Findlay
| rowspan=2  | Democratic-Republican
| rowspan=3 nowrap | Dec 10, 1821 –Mar 3, 1827
| rowspan=3 | Elected late in 1821.Retired.

|- style="height:2em"
| 

|- style="height:2em"
|  | Jacksonian
| 
| rowspan=3 | 7
| rowspan=3 | Elected in 1825.Lost re-election.
| rowspan=3 nowrap | Mar 4, 1825 –Mar 3, 1831
| rowspan=3  | NationalRepublican
| rowspan=3 align=right | William Marks
! rowspan=3 | 8

|- style="height:2em"
! rowspan=3 | 8
| rowspan=3 align=left | Isaac D. Barnard
| rowspan=3  | Jacksonian
| rowspan=3 nowrap | Mar 4, 1827 –Dec 6, 1831
| rowspan=3 | Elected in 1826.Resigned to due ill health.
| rowspan=5 | 8
| 

|- style="height:2em"
| 

|- style="height:2em"
| rowspan=3 
| rowspan=8 | 8
| rowspan=5 | Elected in 1830.Resigned to become U.S. Minister to Russia.
| rowspan=5 nowrap | Mar 4, 1831 –Jun 30, 1834
| rowspan=5  | Jacksonian
| rowspan=5 align=right | William Wilkins
! rowspan=5 | 9

|- style="height:2em"
| colspan=3 | Vacant
| nowrap | Dec 6, 1831 –Dec 13, 1831
|  

|- style="height:2em"
! 9
| align=left | George M. Dallas
|  | Jacksonian
| nowrap | Dec 13, 1831 –Mar 3, 1833
| Elected to finish Barnard's term.Retired.

|- style="height:2em"
| colspan=3 | Vacant
| nowrap | Mar 4, 1833 – Dec 7, 1833
| Legislature failed to elect.
| rowspan=6 | 9
| rowspan=4 

|- style="height:2em"
! rowspan=5 | 10
| rowspan=5 align=left | Samuel McKean
| rowspan=4  | Jacksonian
| rowspan=5 nowrap | Dec 7, 1833 –Mar 3, 1839
| rowspan=5 | Elected late in 1833.

|- style="height:2em"
|  
| nowrap | Jun 30, 1834 –Dec 6, 1834
| colspan=3 | Vacant

|- style="height:2em"
| rowspan=2 | Elected to finish Wilkins's term.
| rowspan=8 nowrap | Dec 6, 1834 –Mar 5, 1845
| rowspan=2  | Jacksonian
| rowspan=8 align=right | James Buchanan
! rowspan=8 | 10

|- style="height:2em"
| 

|- style="height:2em"
|  | Democratic
| 
| rowspan=4 | 9
| rowspan=4 | Re-elected in 1836.
| rowspan=6  | Democratic

|- style="height:2em"
| colspan=3 | Vacant
| nowrap | Mar 4, 1839 –Jan 14, 1840
| Legislature failed to elect.
| rowspan=4 | 10
| rowspan=2 

|- style="height:2em"
! rowspan=8 | 11
| rowspan=8 align=left | Daniel Sturgeon
| rowspan=8  | Democratic
| rowspan=8 nowrap | Jan 14, 1840 –Mar 3, 1851
| rowspan=3 | Elected late in 1840.

|- style="height:2em"
| 

|- style="height:2em"
| 
| rowspan=5 | 10
| rowspan=2 | Re-elected in 1843.Resigned to become U.S. Secretary of State.

|- style="height:2em"
| rowspan=5 | Re-elected in 1845.Retired.
| rowspan=5 | 11
| rowspan=3 

|- style="height:2em"
|  
| nowrap | Mar 5, 1845 –Mar 13, 1845
| colspan=3 | Vacant

|- style="height:2em"
| rowspan=2 | Elected in 1845.Retired.
| rowspan=2 nowrap | Mar 13, 1845 –Mar 3, 1849
| rowspan=2  | Democratic
| rowspan=2 align=right | Simon Cameron
! rowspan=2 | 11

|- style="height:2em"
| 

|- style="height:2em"
| 
| rowspan=3 | 11
| rowspan=3 | Elected in 1849.
| rowspan=3 nowrap | Mar 4, 1849 –Mar 3, 1855
| rowspan=3  | Whig
| rowspan=3 align=right | James Cooper
! rowspan=3 | 12

|- style="height:2em"
! rowspan=4 | 12
| rowspan=4 align=left |Richard Brodhead
| rowspan=4  | Democratic
| rowspan=4 nowrap | Mar 4, 1851 –Mar 3, 1857
| rowspan=4 | Elected in 1851.
| rowspan=4 | 12
| 

|- style="height:2em"
| 

|- style="height:2em"
| rowspan=2 
| rowspan=4 | 12
| Legislature failed to elect.
| nowrap | Mar 4, 1855 –Jan 14, 1856
| colspan=3 | Vacant

|- style="height:2em"
| rowspan=3 | Elected late in 1856.Retired.
| rowspan=3 nowrap | Jan 14, 1856 –Mar 3, 1861
| rowspan=3  | Democratic
| rowspan=3 align=right | William Bigler
! rowspan=3 | 13

|- style="height:2em"
! rowspan=2 | 13
| rowspan=2 align=left | Simon Cameron
| rowspan=2  | Republican
| rowspan=2 nowrap | Mar 4, 1857 –Mar 4, 1861
| rowspan=2 | Elected in 1857.Resigned to become U.S. Secretary of War.
| rowspan=4 | 13
| 

|- style="height:2em"
| 

|- style="height:2em"
| colspan=3 | Vacant
| nowrap | Mar 4, 1861 –Mar 14, 1861
|  
| rowspan=2 
| rowspan=4 | 13
| rowspan=4 | Elected in 1861.Lost re-election.
| rowspan=4 nowrap | Mar 4, 1861 –Mar 3, 1867
| rowspan=4  | Republican
| rowspan=4 align=right | Edgar Cowan
! rowspan=4 | 14

|- style="height:2em"
! 14
| align=left | David Wilmot
|  | Republican
| nowrap | Mar 14, 1861 –Mar 3, 1863
| Elected in 1861 to finish Cameron's term.Retired.

|- style="height:2em"
! rowspan=3 | 15
| rowspan=3 align=left | Charles R. Buckalew
| rowspan=3  | Democratic
| rowspan=3 nowrap | Mar 4, 1863 –Mar 3, 1869
| rowspan=3 | Elected in 1863.
| rowspan=3 | 14
| 

|- style="height:2em"
| 

|- style="height:2em"
| 
| rowspan=3 | 14
| rowspan=3 | Elected in 1867.
| rowspan=6 nowrap | Mar 4, 1867 –Mar 12, 1877
| rowspan=6  | Republican
| rowspan=6 align=right | Simon Cameron
! rowspan=6 | 15

|- style="height:2em"
! rowspan=3 | 16
| rowspan=3 align=left | John Scott
| rowspan=3  | Republican
| rowspan=3 nowrap | Mar 4, 1869 –Mar 3, 1875
| rowspan=3 | Elected in 1869.Retired.
| rowspan=3 | 15
| 

|- style="height:2em"
| 

|- style="height:2em"
| 
| rowspan=5 | 15
| rowspan=3 | Re-elected in 1873.Resigned.

|- style="height:2em"
! rowspan=5 | 17
| rowspan=5 align=left | William A. Wallace
| rowspan=5  | Democratic
| rowspan=5 nowrap | Mar 4, 1875 –Mar 3, 1881
| rowspan=5 | Elected in 1875.Lost re-election.
| rowspan=5 | 16
| 

|- style="height:2em"
| rowspan=3 

|- style="height:2em"
|  
| nowrap | Mar 12, 1877 –Mar 20, 1877
| colspan=3 | Vacant

|- style="height:2em"
| Elected in 1877 to finish his father's term.
| rowspan=10 nowrap | Mar 20, 1877 –Mar 3, 1897
| rowspan=10  | Republican
| rowspan=10 align=right | J. Donald Cameron
! rowspan=10 | 16

|- style="height:2em"
| 
| rowspan=3 | 16
| rowspan=3 | Re-elected in 1879.

|- style="height:2em"
! rowspan=3 | 18
| rowspan=3 align=left | John I. Mitchell
| rowspan=3  | Republican
| rowspan=3 nowrap | Mar 4, 1881 –Mar 3, 1887
| rowspan=3 | Elected in 1881.
| rowspan=3 | 17
| 

|- style="height:2em"
| 

|- style="height:2em"
| 
| rowspan=3 | 17
| rowspan=3 | Re-elected in 1885.

|- style="height:2em"
! rowspan=10 | 19
| rowspan=6 align=left | Matthew Quay
| rowspan=6  | Republican
| rowspan=6 nowrap | Mar 4, 1887 –Mar 3, 1899
| rowspan=3 | Elected in early 1887.
| rowspan=3 | 18
| 

|- style="height:2em"
| 

|- style="height:2em"
| 
| rowspan=3 | 18
| rowspan=3 | Re-elected in 1891.Retired.

|- style="height:2em"
| rowspan=3 | Re-elected in 1893.Legislature failed to re-elect.
| rowspan=3 | 19
| 

|- style="height:2em"
| 

|- style="height:2em"
| 
| rowspan=4 | 19
| rowspan=4 | Elected in 1897.
| rowspan=18 nowrap | Mar 4, 1897 –Dec 31, 1921
| rowspan=18  | Republican
| rowspan=18 align=right | Boies Penrose
! rowspan=18 | 17

|- style="height:2em"
| colspan=2 | Vacant
| nowrap | Mar 4, 1899 –Jan 16, 1901
| Quay was appointed to continue the term, but the Senate rejected his appointment.
| rowspan=5 | 20
| rowspan=2 

|- style="height:2em"
| rowspan=3 align=left | Matthew Quay
| rowspan=3  | Republican
| rowspan=3 nowrap | Jan 16, 1901 –May 28, 1904
| rowspan=3 | Elected late in 1901.Died.

|- style="height:2em"
| 

|- style="height:2em"
| rowspan=2 
| rowspan=4 | 20
| rowspan=4 | Re-elected in 1903.

|- style="height:2em"
! rowspan=3 | 20
| rowspan=3 align=left | Philander C. Knox
| rowspan=3  | Republican
| rowspan=3 nowrap | Jun 10, 1904 –Mar 3, 1909
| Appointed to continue Quay's term.Elected in 1905 to finish Quay's term.

|- style="height:2em"
| rowspan=2 | Re-elected in 1905.Resigned to become U.S. Secretary of State.
| rowspan=4 | 21
| 

|- style="height:2em"
| 

|- style="height:2em"
| colspan=3 | Vacant
| nowrap | Mar 4, 1909 –Mar 17, 1909
|  
| rowspan=2 
| rowspan=4 | 21
| rowspan=4 | Re-elected in 1909.

|- style="height:2em"
! rowspan=4 | 21
| rowspan=4 align=left | George T. Oliver
| rowspan=4  | Republican
| rowspan=4 nowrap | Mar 17, 1909 –Mar 3, 1917
| Elected to finish Knox's term

|- style="height:2em"
| rowspan=3 | Re-elected in 1911.Retired.
| rowspan=3 | 22
| 

|- style="height:2em"
| 

|- style="height:2em"
| 
| rowspan=3 | 22
| rowspan=3 | Re-elected in 1914.

|- style="height:2em"
! rowspan=3 | 22
| rowspan=3 align=left | Philander C. Knox
| rowspan=3  | Republican
| rowspan=3 nowrap | Mar 4, 1917 –Oct 12, 1921
| rowspan=3 | Elected in 1916.Died.
| rowspan=9 | 23
| 

|- style="height:2em"
| 

|- style="height:2em"
| rowspan=7 
| rowspan=9 | 23
| rowspan=3 | Re-elected in 1920.Died.

|- style="height:2em"
| colspan=3 | Vacant
| nowrap | Oct 12, 1921 –Oct 24, 1921
|  

|- style="height:2em"
! rowspan=3 | 23
| rowspan=3 align=left | William E. Crow
| rowspan=3  | Republican
| rowspan=3 nowrap | Oct 24, 1921 –Aug 2, 1922
| rowspan=3 | Appointed to continue Knox's term.Died.

|- style="height:2em"
|  
| nowrap | Dec 31, 1921 –Jan 9, 1922
| colspan=3 | Vacant

|- style="height:2em"
| rowspan=5 | Appointed to continue Penrose's term.Elected to finish Penrose's term.Lost renomination.
| rowspan=5 nowrap | Jan 9, 1922 –Mar 3, 1927
| rowspan=5  | Republican
| rowspan=5 align=right | George W. Pepper
! rowspan=5 | 18

|- style="height:2em"
| colspan=3 | Vacant
| nowrap | Aug 2, 1922 –Aug 8, 1922
|  

|- style="height:2em"
! rowspan=9 | 24
| rowspan=9 align=left | David A. Reed
| rowspan=9  | Republican
| rowspan=9 nowrap | Aug 8, 1922 –Jan 3, 1935
| Appointed to continue Knox's term.Elected to finish Knox's term.

|- style="height:2em"
| rowspan=3 | Elected in 1922.
| rowspan=3 | 24
| 

|- style="height:2em"
| 

|- style="height:2em"
| 
| rowspan=5 | 24
| rowspan=2 | William Scott Vare (R) was elected in 1926, but the Governor refused to certify the election and the Senate refused to qualify him.
| rowspan=2 nowrap | Mar 4, 1927 –Dec 9, 1929
| rowspan=2 colspan=3 | Vacant

|- style="height:2em"
| rowspan=5 | Re-elected in 1928.Lost re-election.
| rowspan=5 | 25
| rowspan=3 

|- style="height:2em"
| Appointed to continue Vare's term.Lost nomination to finish Vare's term.
| nowrap | Dec 11, 1929 –Dec 1, 1930
|  | Republican
| align=right | Joseph R. Grundy
! 19

|- style="height:2em"
| rowspan=2 | Elected in 1930 to finish Vare's term
| rowspan=8 nowrap | Dec 2, 1930 –Jan 3, 1945
| rowspan=8  | Republican
| rowspan=8 align=right | James J. Davis
! rowspan=8 | 20

|- style="height:2em"
| 

|- style="height:2em"
| 
| rowspan=3 | 25
| rowspan=3 | Re-elected in 1932.

|- style="height:2em"
! rowspan=6 | 25
| rowspan=6 align=left | Joe Guffey
| rowspan=6  | Democratic
| rowspan=6 nowrap | Jan 3, 1935 –Jan 3, 1947
| rowspan=3 | Elected in 1934.
| rowspan=3 | 26
| 

|- style="height:2em"
| 

|- style="height:2em"
| 
| rowspan=3 | 26
| rowspan=3 | Re-elected in 1938.Lost re-election.

|- style="height:2em"
| rowspan=3 | Re-elected in 1940.Lost re-election.
| rowspan=3 | 27
| 

|- style="height:2em"
| 

|- style="height:2em"
| 
| rowspan=3 | 27
| rowspan=3 | Elected in 1944.Lost re-election.
| rowspan=3 nowrap | Jan 3, 1945 –Jan 3, 1951
| rowspan=3  | Democratic
| rowspan=3 align=right | Francis Myers
! rowspan=3 | 21

|- style="height:2em"
! rowspan=6 | 26
| rowspan=6 align=left | Edward Martin
| rowspan=6  | Republican
| rowspan=6 nowrap | Jan 3, 1947 –Jan 3, 1959
| rowspan=3 | Elected in 1946.
| rowspan=3 | 28
| 

|- style="height:2em"
| 

|- style="height:2em"
| 
| rowspan=3 | 28
| rowspan=3 | Elected in 1950.Lost re-election.
| rowspan=3 nowrap | Jan 3, 1951 –Jan 3, 1957
| rowspan=3  | Republican
| rowspan=3 align=right | James H. Duff
! rowspan=3 | 22

|- style="height:2em"
| rowspan=3 | Re-elected in 1952.Retired.
| rowspan=3 | 29
| 

|- style="height:2em"
| 

|- style="height:2em"
| 
| rowspan=3 | 29
| rowspan=3 | Elected in 1956.
| rowspan=6 nowrap | Jan 3, 1957 –Jan 3, 1969
| rowspan=6  | Democratic
| rowspan=6 align=right | Joseph S. Clark Jr.
! rowspan=6 | 23

|- style="height:2em"
! rowspan=9 | 27
| rowspan=9 align=left | Hugh Scott
| rowspan=9  | Republican
| rowspan=9 nowrap | Jan 3, 1959 –Jan 3, 1977
| rowspan=3 | Elected in 1958.
| rowspan=3 | 30
| 

|- style="height:2em"
| 

|- style="height:2em"
| 
| rowspan=3 | 30
| rowspan=3 | Re-elected in 1962.Lost re-election.

|- style="height:2em"
| rowspan=3 | Re-elected in 1964.
| rowspan=3 | 31
| 

|- style="height:2em"
| 

|- style="height:2em"
| 
| rowspan=3 | 31
| rowspan=3 | Elected in 1968.
| rowspan=6 nowrap | Jan 3, 1969 –Jan 3, 1981
| rowspan=6  | Republican
| rowspan=6 align=right | Richard Schweiker
! rowspan=6 | 24

|- style="height:2em"
| rowspan=3 | Re-elected in 1970.Retired.
| rowspan=3 | 32
| 

|- style="height:2em"
| 

|- style="height:2em"
| 
| rowspan=3 | 32
| rowspan=3 | Re-elected in 1974.Retired.

|- style="height:2em"
! rowspan=8 | 28
| rowspan=8 align=left | John Heinz
| rowspan=8  | Republican
| rowspan=8 nowrap | Jan 3, 1977 –Apr 4, 1991
| rowspan=3 | Elected in 1976.
| rowspan=3 | 33
| 

|- style="height:2em"
| 

|- style="height:2em"
| 
| rowspan=3 | 33
| rowspan=3 | Elected in 1980.
| rowspan=18 nowrap | Jan 3, 1981 –Jan 3, 2011
| rowspan=17  | Republican
| rowspan=18 align=right | Arlen Specter
! rowspan=18 | 25

|- style="height:2em"
| rowspan=3 | Re-elected in 1982.
| rowspan=3 | 34
| 

|- style="height:2em"
| 

|- style="height:2em"
| 
| rowspan=5 | 34
| rowspan=5 | Re-elected in 1986.

|- style="height:2em"
| rowspan=2 | Re-elected in 1988.Died.
| rowspan=5 | 35
| 

|- style="height:2em"
| rowspan=3 

|- style="height:2em"
| colspan=3 | Vacant
| nowrap | Apr 4, 1991 –May 9, 1991
|  

|- style="height:2em"
! rowspan=2 | 29
| rowspan=2 align=left | Harris Wofford
| rowspan=2  | Democratic
| rowspan=2 nowrap | May 9, 1991 –Jan 3, 1995
| rowspan=2 | Appointed to continue Heinz's term.Elected to finish Heinz's term.Lost re-election.

|- style="height:2em"
| 
| rowspan=3 | 35
| rowspan=3 | Re-elected in 1992.

|- style="height:2em"
! rowspan=6 | 30
| rowspan=6 align=left | Rick Santorum
| rowspan=6  | Republican
| rowspan=6 nowrap | Jan 3, 1995 –Jan 3, 2007
| rowspan=3 | Elected in 1994.
| rowspan=3 | 36
| 

|- style="height:2em"
| 

|- style="height:2em"
| 
| rowspan=3 | 36
| rowspan=3 | Re-elected in 1998.

|- style="height:2em"
| rowspan=3 | Re-elected in 2000.Lost re-election.
| rowspan=3 | 37
| 

|- style="height:2em"
| 

|- style="height:2em"
| 
| rowspan=4 | 37
| rowspan=4 | Re-elected in 2004.Changed parties Apr 28, 2009.Lost renomination.

|- style="height:2em"
! rowspan=10 | 31
| rowspan=10 align=left | Bob Casey Jr.
| rowspan=10  | Democratic
| rowspan=10 nowrap | Jan 3, 2007 –Present
| rowspan=4 | Elected in 2006.
| rowspan=4 | 38
| 

|- style="height:2em"
| rowspan=2 

|- style="height:2em"
|  | Democratic

|- style="height:2em"
| 
| rowspan=3 | 38
| rowspan=3 | Elected in 2010.
| rowspan=6 nowrap | Jan 3, 2011 –Jan 3, 2023
| rowspan=6  | Republican
| rowspan=6 align=right | Pat Toomey
! rowspan=6 | 26

|- style="height:2em"
| rowspan=3 | Re-elected in 2012.
| rowspan=3 | 39
| 

|- style="height:2em"
| 

|- style="height:2em"
| 
| rowspan=3 | 39
| rowspan=3 | Re-elected in 2016.Retired.

|- style="height:2em"
| rowspan=3 | Re-elected in 2018.
| rowspan=3 | 40
| 

|- style="height:2em"
| 

|- style="height:2em"
| 
| rowspan=3 | 40
| rowspan=3 | Elected in 2022.
| rowspan=3 nowrap | Jan 3, 2023 –Present''
| rowspan=3  | Democratic
| rowspan=3 align=right | John Fetterman
! rowspan=3 | 27

|- style="height:2em"
| rowspan=3 colspan=5 | To be determined in the 2024 election.
| rowspan=3| 41
| 

|- style="height:2em"
| 

|- style="height:2em"
| 
| 41
| colspan=5 | To be determined in the 2028 election.

Notes

References

See also

 List of United States representatives from Pennsylvania
 List of United States Senate elections in Pennsylvania
 United States congressional delegations from Pennsylvania

External links
 Members of Congress from Pennsylvania, govtrack.us
 U.S. Senate members from Pennsylvania, civil.services

 
United States Senators
Pennsylvania